Yakup Kılıç (born July 13, 1986) is a Turkish boxer in the featherweight (57 kg) discipline. He is member of Istanbul Fenerbahçe Boxing Club.

Career
Kılıç participated at the 2005 Mediterranean Games in Almería, Spain and won bronze medal. He boxed another bronze medal at the 2009 Mediterranean Games in Pescara, Italy.

At the European Championships 2006 he lost his first bout against Irish Eric Donovan 29:33.

At the 2007 World Amateur Boxing Championships held in Chicago, USA, he won a bronze medal
and qualified for the 2008 Olympics.
He did so by beating Arash Usmanee of Canada by a slim one point margin 20–19.

At the Olympics 2008 he lost his semifinal to Vasyl Lomachenko and won Bronze.

Olympic Games results
2008 (as a featherweight)
1st round bye
Defeated Satoshi Shimizu (Japan) 12-9
Defeated Abdelkader Chadi (Algeria) 13-6
Lost to Vasyl Lomachenko (Ukraine) 1-10

World Championships results
2005 (as a featherweight)
Defeated Aboubakr Seddik Lbida (Morocco) 29-20
Lost to Berik Serikbayev (Kazakhstan) 25-29

2007 (as a featherweight)
Defeated Pablo Figuls (Costa Rica) RSCO 3
Defeated Arash Usmanee (Canada) 20-19
Defeated Sailom Ardee (Thailand) 22-13
Lost to Albert Selimov (Russia) walk-over (placed 3rd)

References
sports-reference

External links 
 

1986 births
Living people
Fenerbahçe boxers
Boxers at the 2008 Summer Olympics
Olympic boxers of Turkey
Olympic bronze medalists for Turkey
Olympic medalists in boxing
Medalists at the 2008 Summer Olympics
Turkish male boxers
AIBA World Boxing Championships medalists
Mediterranean Games bronze medalists for Turkey
Competitors at the 2005 Mediterranean Games
Competitors at the 2009 Mediterranean Games
Mediterranean Games medalists in boxing
Featherweight boxers
People from Elazığ
21st-century Turkish people